William Roden may refer to:
 William Thomas Roden, English artist
 William Sargeant Roden, English iron master and politician

See also
 William C. Rhoden, American sports journalist and author